Isao Ko Abe (阿部 功, February 18, 1912 – February 15, 1980) was a Japanese hammer thrower. He competed at the 1936 Summer Olympics and finished in 13th place.

After his athletic retirement, he joined the Ministry of Railways.

References

1912 births
1980 deaths
Japanese male hammer throwers
Olympic male hammer throwers
Olympic athletes of Japan
Athletes (track and field) at the 1936 Summer Olympics
Japan Championships in Athletics winners
20th-century Japanese people